The ethnic groups in Yugoslavia were grouped into constitutive peoples and minorities.

First Yugoslavia
 
 
The constituent peoples of the Kingdom of Serbs, Croats and Slovenes (1918–29), as evident by the official name of the state (it was colloquially known as "Yugoslavia", however) were the Serbs, Croats and Slovenes.

The 1921 population census recorded numerous ethnic groups. Based on language, the "Yugoslavs" (collectively Serbs, Croats, Slovenes and Slavic Muslims) constituted 82.87 percent of the country's population.

Identity politics failed to assimilate the South Slavic peoples of Yugoslavia into a Yugoslav identity. During the reign of King Aleksandar I, a modern single Yugoslav identity was unsuccessfully propagated to erase the particularistic identities.

Second Yugoslavia
 
Communist Yugoslav terminology used the word "nation" (nacija, narod) for the country's constitutive peoples (konstitutivne nacije), that is, for the Serbs, Croats, Slovenes, Muslims, Macedonians, and Montenegrins. The term "nationality" (narodnost) was used to describe the status of the Albanians and Hungarians, and other non-constitutive peoples, distinguishing them from the nations, and "national minorities" (nacionalne manjine) which they were previously described as.

Following the Liberation of Yugoslavia, the Communist Party of Yugoslavia reorganized the country into federal republics (Serbia, Croatia, Bosnia and Herzegovina, Slovenia, Macedonia, and Montenegro). Furthermore, two autonomous provinces were created within the Serbian republic, Vojvodina (inhabited by a Hungarian minority) and Kosovo and Metohija (inhabited by an Albanian minority), based on the significant presence of minorities. This minority criterion (a combination of historical and ethnic criteria) was only applied to Serbia (and not Italian-inhabited Istria, or Serb-inhabited Krajina, for example). The presence of constitutive peoples in territories other than their "nation-state" (i.e. Serbs in Croatia) was rejected as a basis for potential autonomous provinces, as Communist rhetoric maintained that each constituent people had a home republic, and was therefore unable to obtain autonomy status in another republic despite significant presence.

After the war, the slogan "Brotherhood and unity" designated the official policy of inter-ethnic relations in the country. The policy prescribed that Yugoslavia's peoples were equal groups that coexist peacefully in the federation.

The 1974 Yugoslav Constitution provided for equality of the constituent peoples and minorities.

Censuses

First Yugoslavia

Second Yugoslavia

Terminology
narod
nacija
nacionalnost
narodnost

Annotations

References

Sources

 
 
 
 
 

 

 
Demographics of Yugoslavia
Yugoslavia